Inzinzac-Lochrist is a commune in the Morbihan department of Brittany in north-western France.

Demographics
Inhabitants of Inzinzac-Lochrist are called in French Inzinzacois or Lochristois.

Geography

The town has several urban centres : Inzinzac, Lochrist, Penquesten. The river Blavet forms a natural boundary to the east and to the south. Historically, Inzinzac-Lochrist belongs to Vannetais.

Map

See also
Communes of the Morbihan department

References

External links

 Mayors of Morbihan Association 

Communes of Morbihan